The Upland Mutual Insurance Inc. is a mutual insurance company in the United States that operates primarily in the state of Kansas. The company's roots go back to 1892 when a group of farmers came together for managing the risk of fire and lightning.

Originally based in unincorporated Upland, Kansas, the company later moved to Junction City, Kansas. The Company's products are marketed through independent insurance agents.

History
In 1896, Upland Mutual Insurance, Inc. was established  to offer Fire and Lightning Insurance to local farmers in  Upland, Kansas.

References

External links
 Official Website

Insurance companies of the United States
Geary County, Kansas
American companies established in 1892
Financial services companies established in 1892